Veliko Golovode is a village in the city of Kruševac, Serbia. According to the 2011 census, the village has a population of  801 people.

Geography 
Veliko Golovode village forms a rough triangle with the villages of Modrica and Mudrakovac, south of the main urban area of Kruševac. The Rasina River flows through the village and just through this part of its flow is known for gold deposits.

Economy

Education

Gallery

References

Populated places in Rasina District